George Robert Patterson (November 9, 1863 – March 21, 1906) was a Republican member of the U.S. House of Representatives from Pennsylvania.

George R. Patterson was born in Lewistown, Pennsylvania.  He attended the Lewistown Academy, and was engaged in mercantile pursuits in 1880.  He moved to Ashland, Pennsylvania, in 1886 and engaged in the wholesale grain and feed business.  He was a delegate to the Republican National Convention in 1900 and 1904.

Patterson was elected as a Republican to the Fifty-seventh, Fifty-eighth, and Fifty-ninth Congresses and served until his death in Washington, D.C.  Interment in Citizens’ Cemetery in Ashland.

See also
List of United States Congress members who died in office (1900–49)

Sources

The Political Graveyard
George Robert Patterson, Late a Representative from Pennsylvania. 1907 U.S. Government Printing Office

1863 births
1906 deaths
People from Ashland, Pennsylvania
Republican Party members of the United States House of Representatives from Pennsylvania
19th-century American politicians